Arab Kheyl (also Romanized as ‘Arab Kheyl; also known as Kaleh ‘Arab Kheyl) is a village in Bahnemir Rural District, Bahnemir District, Babolsar County, Mazandaran Province, Iran. At the 2006 census, its population was 1,261, in 338 families.

References 

Populated places in Babolsar County